Zarrin Dasht County is in Fars province, Iran. The capital of the county is the city of Hajjiabad. At the 2006 census, the county's population was 60,444 in 13,378 households. The following census in 2011 counted 69,438 people in 17,402 households. At the 2016 census, the county's population was 73,199 in 20,328 households.

Administrative divisions

The population history of Zarrin Dasht County's administrative divisions over three consecutive censuses is shown in the following table. The latest census shows two districts, five rural districts, and three cities.

References

 

Counties of Fars Province